The James D. Hathaway House is a historic house located at 311 Pine Street in Fall River, Massachusetts.

Description and history 
It is a -story, wood-framed structure, three bays wide, with a front-gable roof and a flush-boarded facade sheltered by a monumental two-story, Greek Revival style portico with fluted Ionic columns. It was built in 1843 by James D. Hathaway, a carpenter, and was perhaps designed by Russell Warren or copied by Hathaway from his designs. It is one of seven extant monumental temple-fronted Greek Revival houses in Fall River. It is also located within the Lower Highlands Historic District.

The house was added to the National Register of Historic Places in 1983. It currently functions as a law office.

See also
National Register of Historic Places listings in Fall River, Massachusetts
William Lindsey House (Fall River, Massachusetts)
John Mace Smith House
Osborn House

References

Russell Warren buildings
Houses in Fall River, Massachusetts
National Register of Historic Places in Fall River, Massachusetts
Historic district contributing properties in Massachusetts
Houses on the National Register of Historic Places in Bristol County, Massachusetts
Greek Revival houses in Massachusetts
Houses completed in 1843